Rangerville is a village in Cameron County, Texas, United States. It was incorporated in 1958. The population was 289 at the 2010 census, up from 203 at the 2000 census.

Rangerville is part of the Brownsville–Harlingen–Raymondville and the Matamoros–Brownsville metropolitan areas.

Geography
Rangerville is located in southwestern Cameron County at  (26.103104, -97.738982).

The village is governed by a mayor and two city commissioners; it has no taxes and provides no services.

Demographics

2020 census

As of the 2020 United States census, there were 255 people, 62 households, and 17 families residing in the village.

2000 census
As of the census of 2000,  203 people, 57 households, and 47 families were residing in the village. The population density was 57.6 people per square mile (22.2/km2). The 66 housing units averaged 18.7/sq mi (7.2/km2). The racial makeup of the village was 65.02% White, 3.45% African American, 29.56% from other races, and 1.97% from two or more races. Hispanics or Latinos of any race were 77.34% of the population.

Of the 57 households,  38.6% had children under the age of 18 living with them, 70.2% were married couples living together, 8.8% had a female householder with no husband present, and 15.8% were not families. About 12.3% of all households were made up of individuals, and 3.5% had someone living alone who was 65 years of age or older. The average household size was 3.56, and the average family size was 4.00.

In the village, the age distribution was 30.5% under  18, 10.3% from 18 to 24, 25.6% from 25 to 44, 25.6% from 45 to 64, and 7.9% who were 65 or older. The median age was 33 years. For every 100 females, there were 101.0 males. For every 100 females age 18 and over, there were 95.8 males.

The median income for a household in the village was $30,357, and for a family was $30,357. Males had a median income of $25,781 versus $22,500 for females. The per capita income for the village was $18,185. About 28.6% of families and 32.6% of the population were below the poverty line, including 44.3% of those under the age of 18 and 54.5% of those 65 or over.

Education
Rangerville is located in the San Benito Consolidated Independent School District.

In addition, South Texas Independent School District operates magnet schools that serve the community.

References

Unincorporated communities in Cameron County, Texas
Unincorporated communities in Texas
Populated places disestablished in 2000
Former cities in Texas